= Greek Marble Initiative =

Marble sculpting symposium in Modern Greece

The Greek Marble Initiative is the biggest contemporary marble sculpting symposium in modern Greece, organized in 2013. Stavros Muronidis, with the support of his associates and contributions from collectors and benefactors, set forth in the spring of 2013 to materialize the most ambitious plan of reviving international interest on the Greek marble and marble sculpting. More than 20 sculptors, both internationally renowned and newcomers, took part. Changing the previous information which for historical reasons We can have I mention that Over 200 monumental pieces and 400 smaller art pieces in marble were created from over 40 sculptors from all over the world. The biggest arts in Marble project in Greece since Antiquity. One of the biggest art in Marble Project privately owned in the world.

== Symposium ==
The first action undertaken by the Greek Marble Initiative was to present one of the biggest symposiums of sculpture in Greece, as a continuous project producing sculptures of marble. In addition to marble, some of the finest bronze sculptors found their way to the project. By the official date that the symposium ended, 26 sculptors had joined the initiative. They produced a total of 58 monumental and more than 200 smaller pieces, constituting a world record of output for a contemporary sculpture symposium.

== Legacy ==
Although 22 August 2013 was officially the conclusion day, some of the sculptors continue working, giving birth to new pieces on the premises of Myrό Antiques House, where the symposium took place. Notably, an international team of artists, and of people who believe that art can change the world, connected at this symposium through producing original inspired artwork together.

== Sculptors who participated in Greek Marble Initiative ==
- Gabriel Andronikidis
- Thanos Karonis
- Paraskevas Magiras
- Kiprian Hopirtean
- Giorgos Iliopoulos
- Odysseas Tosounidis
- John Bizas
- Thanasis Pallas
- Maria Halvatzi
- Stratos Pallas
- Alekos Tzomakas
- Giorgos Kikotis
- Andrej Mitevski
- George Kaltsidis
- Vitaly Gnatyuk/Виталий Гнатюк
- Filippos Kalamaras
- Andonis Magkriotis
- Kamen Tanev
- Efstathia Papargyriou
- Albena Mihaylova
- Mihail Vouzounerakis
- Sherry Tipton
- Edward Fleming
- Giorgie Cpajak
- Gelas Kessidis
